101 Virginis is a red giant variable star in the Boötes constellation, currently on the asymptotic giant branch. It was originally catalogued as 101 Virginis by Flamsteed due to an error in the position.  When it was confirmed as a variable star, it was actually within the border of the constellation Bootes and given the name CY Boötis.

The variability is not strongly defined but a primary period of 23 days and a secondary period of 340 days have been reported.

CY Boo is listed in the Hipparcos catalogue as a "problem binary", a star which was suspected of being multiple but for which the Hipparcos observations did not give a satisfactory solution.  Further observations have always shown it to be single.

References

External links
 VizieR: HR 5352
 Aladin: Image 101 Virginis

Boötes
Virginis, 101
Semiregular variable stars
125180
069829
M-type giants
BD+15 2690
Bootis, CY
5352